Nicole Poore is an American politician and a Democratic member of the Delaware Senate representing District 12. Poore was elected Senate Majority Leader in 2019 after previously serving as Senate Majority Whip.

Electoral history
In 2012, Poore challenged incumbent Republican Dorinda Connor and won the three-way general election with 12,875 votes (60.3%) against Connor and Libertarian candidate Brad Thomas.
In 2016, Poore was unopposed in the general election, winning 18,961 votes.

References

External links
Official page at the Delaware General Assembly
Campaign site
 

21st-century American women politicians
21st-century American politicians
Democratic Party Delaware state senators
Living people
Wilmington University alumni
Place of birth missing (living people)
Women state legislators in Delaware
Year of birth missing (living people)